Aindhu Laksham is a 1969 Indian Tamil language film directed by G. Ramakrishnan. The film featured Gemini Ganesan, B. Saroja Devi, Cho and Shylashri in the lead roles.

Plot 
Radha Krishnan is a poor young man looking for a job. Krishna is a young woman and the daughter of a millionaire, Eswaran. Radha and Krishna love each other. Eswaran is looking for a bridegroom to his daughter befitting his status. To become Eswaran's son-in-law, Radha needs five lakhs rupees. Another person, the Zamindar of Karadiyur, also needs five lakhs rupees to settle his loans. His son, also named Radha, is in love with a poor young woman, Amudha who is the younger sister of the poor young man Radha. Radha's friend is Nachu. He is in love with Manju who wants a pet dog. So, everyone is looking for something to fulfill their need. The film is a hilarious entertainer showing what each one does to fulfill their needs.

Cast 

 Gemini Ganesan as Radha Krishnan
 B. Saroja Devi as Krishna
 Cho as Nachu
 Shylashri
 S. A. Ashokan
 Major Sundarrajan as Eswaran
 Manorama as Manju
 Thengai Srinivasan as Chinna Jameendar
 Sachu as Amutha (Radhakrishnan Sister)
 Radhabhai
 Kanthimathi
 Rama Rao
 Suruli Rajan as Suruttu Suruli
 I. S. R.
 K. P. Ramakrishnan
 Gemini Mahalingam
 S. P. Perumal
 Aisarivelan
 Ravindran
 Nilavai Murugesan
 Nambirajan
 Gunalan
 G. V. Sarma
 Aliyar
 Pakoda Kadhar

Soundtrack 
Music was composed by S. M. Subbaiah Naidu while the lyrics were penned by Kannadasan, Vaali, Avinasi Mani and Thiruchi Thyagarajan.

References

External links 

 http://www.gomolo.com/aindhu-latcham-movie/9675

Indian comedy-drama films
Films scored by S. M. Subbaiah Naidu
1969 films
1969 comedy-drama films